Pernille Jensen (born 15 April 1973) is a Danish swimmer. She competed in the women's 400 metre freestyle and women's 800 metre freestyle events at the 1988 Summer Olympics.

References

External links
 

1973 births
Living people
Danish female swimmers
Danish female freestyle swimmers
Olympic swimmers of Denmark
Swimmers at the 1988 Summer Olympics
People from Esbjerg
Sportspeople from the Region of Southern Denmark